Charles S. Firth was an American football player and coach of football and basketball.  He served as the head football coach at Virginia Agricultural and Mechanical College and Polytechnic Institute (VPI)—now known as Virginia Tech—for one season in 1897 and at Hillsdale College for one season in 1913, compiling a career college football coaching record of 7–5–1.  Firth was an alumnus of the University of Chicago.

Head coaching record

References

Year of birth missing
Year of death missing
Central Dutch men's basketball coaches
Chicago Maroons football players
Hillsdale Chargers football coaches
Hillsdale Chargers men's basketball coaches
Virginia Tech Hokies football coaches